Wilkins Gulch is a valley in western Marin County, California, United States, located northwest of Pike County Gulch. It is associated with a small stream.

The stream descends the western slope of Bolinas Ridge, crosses State Route 1, and drains into Bolinas Lagoon.

References

See also
List of watercourses in the San Francisco Bay Area

Rivers of Marin County, California
West Marin
Rivers of Northern California
Valleys of Marin County, California